Pogogyne abramsii is a rare species of flowering plant in the mint family known by the common name San Diego mesa mint.

Distribution 
It is endemic to San Diego County, California, where it is known only from a few sites at vernal pools in and around San Diego and its suburbs. Much of its range is located on the grounds of Marine Corps Air Station Miramar. The plant has been federally listed as an endangered species since 1978.

Description 
Pogogyne abramsii is a small, aromatic, densely hairy annual herb producing erect stems topped with tiny but showy inflorescences. The inflorescence contains purple-tinged green bracts and densely hairy sepals surrounding lipped, bell-shaped flowers each about a centimeter long. The flower is pinkish-purple with a purple-spotted white throat. It has a strong mint scent.

The plant is pollinated by several species of bee, including honey bees (Apis mellifera), Exomalopsis nitens and E. torticornis, and the bee fly Bombylius facialis.

The epithet abramsii commemorates LeRoy Abrams.

References

External links 
 Jepson Manual Treatment: Pogogyne abramsii
 USDA Plants Profile: Pogogyne abramsii
 California Native Plant Society Rare Plant Profile
 California Chaparral Institute: Vernal Pools
 Pogogyne abramsii — Photo gallery

abramsii
Endemic flora of California
Natural history of the California chaparral and woodlands
Natural history of San Diego County, California
Plants described in 1931
Flora without expected TNC conservation status